Krivov or Kryvov (from кривой meaning crooked) is a Russian masculine surname, its feminine counterpart is Krivova or Kryvova. It may refer to
Andrei Krivov (born 1976), Russian football player
Andrey Krivov (born 1985), Russian race walker
Stepan Krivov (born 1990), Russian ice hockey player
Valeriy Kryvov (1951–1994), Ukrainian volleyball player

Russian-language surnames